Fresne-le-Plan is a commune in the Seine-Maritime department in the Normandy region in north-western France.

Geography

Population

Places of interest
 The church of Sts.Pierre & Paul, dating from the thirteenth century.
 The dovecote of Mesnil Grain.

See also
Communes of the Seine-Maritime department

References

Communes of Seine-Maritime